This is a list of Old Sylvestrians, the alumni of St. Sylvester's College, Kandy, Sri Lanka.

See also
 St. Sylvester's College

References

External links 
 St. Sylvester's College OBA
 St. Sylvester's College OBA

 
St. Sylvester's College